Arriach is a municipality in the district of Villach-Land in the Austrian state of Carinthia.

Geography
The commune is a state-recognised health resort, its economy mainly depends on tourism.

The municipal area consists of the four cadastral communities: Arriach proper, Innerteuchen, Laastadt, and Sauerwald.

Neighboring municipalities

History
The parish of Ovriach was first mentioned in a 1207 deed. In early modern times, the remote area was a centre of Crypto-protestantism in the Duchy of Carinthia. The present-day municipality was established in 1850; the Sauerwald community joined in 1898.

Religion
According to a 2001 census 68.8% of the population were Protestants, which is the highest percentage of all Carinthian municipalities. Therefore, the Four Evangelists parish church, a Neo-Gothic building erected in 1903, is the largest Protestant church in mainly Catholic Carinthia. It is located at the site of a former 'prayer house' (Bethaus), built after the Patent of Toleration was issued by the Habsburg emperor Joseph II in 1781. Furthermore, Arriach's coat of arms depicts a Eucharist chalice and a Luther rose.

The smaller Catholic parish church dedicated to Sts. Philipp and Jakob, erected about 1200 and rebuilt several times, stands nearby. Arriach also features several historic rustic log homes preserved in quite good condition.

Politics

Seats in the municipal assembly (Gemeinderat) as of 2015 local elections:
Freedom Party of Austria (FPÖ): 9
Austrian People's Party (ÖVP): 4
Social Democratic Party of Austria (SPÖ): 2

Twin towns — sister cities

Arriach is twinned with:
 Wain, Germany, since 1972

References

External links

Municipal website 

Cities and towns in Villach-Land District